Napoleon Community Schools is a public school district located in Napoleon, Michigan, approximately 7 miles South East of Jackson, Michigan.  The district includes Napoleon High School, Ackerson Lake Alternative High School, Napoleon Middle School and Ezra Eby Elementary schools.  The school services students from Napoleon and Norvell Townships, and some parts of Columbia and Grass Lake Townships.

History
Napoleon Community Schools were officially formed in 1921 after the passage of the Consolidated school act. Prior to the passage, many schools operated independently within Napoleon Township, dating back to at least 1909.  In 2016, the school district went to the U.S. Supreme Court over not allowing access for a student's service dog in Fry v. Napoleon Community Schools.

Schools
 Ezra Eby Elementary (K-5)
 Napoleon Middle School (6–8)
 Napoleon High School (9–12)
 Ackerson Lake Alternative High School (9–12)

References

External links

School districts in Michigan
Education in Jackson County, Michigan
1921 establishments in Michigan
School districts established in 1921